The Who Special Edition EP is a video album released in 2003 by Classic Pictures that contains four performances by The Who on the German television program "Beat Club."  All of the performances are lip-synced.

Songs performed
"See Me, Feel Me" (1969)
"I'm a Boy" (1966)
"Pinball Wizard" (1969)
"I'm Free" (1969)

References

The Who EPs
2003 EPs
2003 live albums
2003 video albums
The Who live albums
The Who video albums
Live video albums